Min Guo may refer to:

Republic of China (disambiguation)
Min Kingdom